The 2020–21 season is Queen of the South's eighth consecutive season in the second tier of Scottish football, the Scottish Championship, having been promoted as champions from the Scottish Second Division at the end of the 2012–13 season. Queens will also be competing in the League Cup and the Scottish Cup.

Summary
Queens finished sixth in the Championship. The league season was curtailed to 27 matches, due to the COVID-19 pandemic, starting on 17 October 2020 and ending on 30 April 2021.   

The Doonhamers were knocked out after the first round of the League Cup after the completion of fixtures in Group G that included Greenock Morton, Partick Thistle, Queen's Park and St Mirren.

Queens reached the third round of the Scottish Cup, losing 3-1 at Palmerston to eventual runners-up Hibernian.

The Challenge Cup was not held during the 2020-21 season due to the COVID-19 pandemic.

Results & fixtures

Pre season

Scottish Championship

Scottish League Cup

Scottish Cup

Player statistics

Captains

|-
 
|-

Squad 

 

|}

Disciplinary record

Top scorers
Last updated 30 April 2021

Clean sheets
{| class="wikitable" style="font-size: 95%; text-align: center"
|-
!width=15|
!width=15|
!width=15|
!width=150|Name
!width=80|Scottish Championship
!width=80|League Cup
!width=80|Scottish Cup
!width=80|Total
|-
|1
|GK
|
|Jack Leighfield
|1
|0
|0
|1
|-
|20
|GK
|
|Rohan Ferguson
|3
|1
|1
|5
|-
|30
|GK
|
|Charlie Cowie
|1
|0
|0
|1
|-
|
|
|
! Totals !! 5 !! 1 !! 1 !! 7

Team statistics

Scottish Championship

League table

Results by round

League Cup table

Management statistics
Last updated 3 May 2021

Transfers

Players in

Players out

See also
List of Queen of the South F.C. seasons

Notes

References

Queen of the South F.C. seasons
Queen of the South